Roman Alexandrovich Repilov (born 5 March 1996) is a Russian luger.

Competitive career 
Representing Russia at the 2015–16 Luge World Cup, Repilov placed second in the sprint event in Calgary with a time of 30.279. On 2 December 2016, he came in fifth in the Lake Placid event of the Men's Singles 2016-17 Luge World Cup, but set a new Lake Placid track start record of 6.359 seconds. Then later in the same season he triumphed in the men's singles event at Park City, Utah, came in second twice, in Winterberg, Germany and Sigulda, Latvia and won two men's singles sprint events in Park City and Sigulda.

During the 2017–18 Luge World Cup season Repilov triumphed at Lake Placid and in doing so shattered the track record which had just been set first by his teammate Semen Pavlichenko the previous day and then again by the American slider Tucker West in the previous heat of the finals, with a time of 50.875 seconds.  Repilov was joined on the podium by Pavlichenko, who took the silver, and West, who took home the bronze. Also during the 2017–18 campaign he has won a silver at Altenberg and a bronze at Calgary.

During the 2018–19 Luge World Cup Repilov achieved back to back podium finishes first in placing second in Calgary in the men's singles and then in Lake Placid in successfully defending his 2017–18 triumph there in the men's singles event and also claiming victory in the men's sprint singles event.

Repilov currently resides in Dmitrov. He has a younger brother, Pavel, who is currently competing on youth events.

World Cup podiums

Season titles 
 5 titles – (2 Singles, 3 Sprint singles)

References

External links 

Profile on the Russian Luge Federation

1996 births
Living people
People from Dmitrovsky District, Moscow Oblast
Russian male lugers
Lugers at the 2018 Winter Olympics
Lugers at the 2022 Winter Olympics
Olympic lugers of Russia
Sportspeople from Moscow Oblast